Villa Epecuén was a tourist village in Buenos Aires Province, Argentina, on the eastern shore of Laguna Epecuén, about  north of the city of Carhué. Developed in the early 1920s, Epecuén was accessible from Buenos Aires by train. The Sarmiento Railway line served Villa Epecuén station, while the Midland Railway and the Buenos Aires Great Southern Railway carried passengers to nearby Carhué station. Tourism was developed by an Englishman after taking the land on lease. He marketed the lake as having healing properties, hiring Italian scientists to bolster the claim. At its height, Villa Epecuén could accommodate at least 5,000 visitors.

The village became uninhabitable and was never rebuilt. Many of the ruins are covered by a layer of white and grey salt. At the time, there were up to 280 businesses in Epecuén, including lodges, guesthouses, hotels, and businesses that 25,000 tourists visited between November and March, from the 1950s to the 1970s.

The town reached a population of 1,500 inhabitants at its peak. As of 2011 it had one resident, Pablo Novak, born in 1930, who returned to his home in 2009 when the waters receded after covering the town for 25 years. Pablo's Villa, a 2013 documentary, chronicles the life of the town and of Novak.

The town has been featured in the TV shows Abandoned Engineering (season 4, episode 1), and Mysteries of the Abandoned (season 4, episode 1). It was used as a location in the 2010 film And Soon the Darkness, starring Amber Heard and Karl Urban. The city features as the backdrop to one of Danny MacAskill's street trials cycling videos.

References

External links

 The Town That Spent 25 Years Underwater, Messy Nessy Chic
 Argentina's underwater town that was submerged for 30 years, BBC News

Buildings and structures in Buenos Aires Province
Submerged places
Modern ruins
Ghost towns in South America
Environmental disaster ghost towns
Adolfo Alsina Partido
Defunct resorts
Floods in Argentina
Dam failures in South America
1985 disasters in Argentina
1985 floods in South America